Shosholoza Meyl is a division of the Passenger Rail Agency of South Africa (PRASA) that operates long-distance (intercity) passenger rail services. It operates various train routes across South Africa, carrying approximately 4 million passengers annually. Before 2009, Shosholoza Meyl was a division of Spoornet, but it was transferred after the formation of PRASA.

"Shosholoza" is the name of a popular South African song about workers on a train and it therefore means moving forward. "Meyl" is a word that is related to a South African word for "long distance train", according to the Spoornet/Shosholoza Meyl website. The company's name prior to change was "Mainline Passenger Services".

In August 2010, Shosholoza Meyl suspended services claiming either contract difficulties (between Transnet and Prasa) or unreliable trains. Some services began to resume in November 2010.

Shosholoza Meyl services were suspended by PRASA following a fatal crash with a goods train on 12th February 2020. A revised service was introduced from 27th November 2020, which due to Covid-19 restrictions limits seating capacity and passengers need to supply their own food, drinks, and bedding.

Routes

, Shosholoza Meyl operates the following routes.
Johannesburg – Kimberley – Cape Town
Johannesburg – Pietermaritzburg – Durban
Johannesburg – Bloemfontein – Port Elizabeth
Johannesburg – Bloemfontein – East London
Johannesburg – Nelspruit – Komatipoort
Johannesburg – Polokwane – Musina
Cape Town – Kimberley – Bloemfontein – Pietermaritzburg – Durban
Cape Town – East London

Track and equipment

Shosholoza Meyl trains run on the Cape gauge Transnet mainline track. The trains are locomotive-pulled. Most routes are completely electrified 3 kV DC and 25 kV AC systems, usually class 6E1 or class 18E locomotives on the 3 kV system and class 7E on the 25 kV system. Diesel is used on the Johannesburg – Port Elizabeth trains between Bloemfontein and Noupoort, and on the Durban - Cape Town trains between Bloemfontein and Kimberley. Before 2002, the Pretoria – Cape Town trains were hauled by diesel locomotives between Kimberley and De Aar.

Consists
The trains are made up of three types of coach:
 Sleeper 4: six 4-person compartments and two 2-person coupés, plus shower and toilet facilities.
 Sleeper 6: six 6-person compartments and two 3-person coupés, plus shower and toilet facilities.
 Sitter: 72 seats, in 18 rows of 4 seats with an aisle in the middle, plus toilet facilities. There are also various older types of carriages with differing levels of comfort used as sitters.

Since 1 July 2006 Shosholoza Meyl has operated its sleepers and sitters as separate trains. Starting from 1 November 2006 sleeping carriages were re-introduced on selected Economy Trains, this decision was however reversed shortly thereafter. Now the Economy Trains convey 'Sitter' carriages only.

Incidents 

On 4 January 2018, a passenger train operated by Shosholoza Meyl collided with a truck on a level crossing near Kroonstad. The train was derailed and at least one of the carriages caught fire. Twenty one people were killed and 254 were injured.

On 12 February 2020, another Shosholoza Meyl train collided with a goods train near Bonny Doone Road in Horizon View, west of Johannesburg. One person died in the incident and several people were injured. After the incident, the Railway Safety Regulator suspended all Shosholoza Meyl train operations indefinitely.

See also
Spoornet
Transnet

References

External links
Shosholoza Meyl official website
Premier Classe official website
Passenger Rail Agency of South Africa

Railway companies of South Africa
Transnet
Passenger rail transport in South Africa